Dr. Jean-Christophe Leroux (born April 27, 1969) is a French-Canadian full professor of Drug Formulation and Delivery at the Institute of Pharmaceutical Sciences at the Swiss Federal Institute of Technology ETH Zürich. His research is mainly focused on broadening the field of drug delivery, and the development of biodetoxification systems for the treatment of metabolite disorders. Additionally, he has made important contributions to the field of biomaterials for use in drug delivery.

Education 
Leroux trained as a pharmacist at the University of Montreal (Canada), and received his Ph.D. in Pharmaceutical Sciences (1995) from the University of Geneva (Switzerland). From 1996 to 1997, he was a postdoctoral fellow at University of California, San Francisco.

Career 
Leroux was appointed professor at the University of Montreal in 1997 where he worked until he joined the ETH Zürich. From 2001 to 2010, he held the Tier 2 Canada research chair in drug delivery. He was the chair of the institute of Pharmaceutical Sciences at the ETH Zürich during 2014–2016, and was appointed as head of the department

Leroux has made fundamental and applied contributions to the fields of colloids, biomaterials, and drug delivery. He has published over 250 peer-reviewed manuscripts in top-ranked scientific journals, 14 book chapters and is co-inventor on several patents. Jean-Christophe Leroux is one of the most cited scientists in pharmacy and pharmacology.

Leroux was the associate editor of the European Journal and Pharmaceutics and Biopharmaceutics from 2006 to 2012, and of the Journal of Controlled Release from 2012 to 2017.

In 2015, Leroux co-founded the ETH spin-off companies Versantis AG and Inositec AG that are developing drugs for the treatment of hyperammonemia and vascular calcification, respectively. Inositec AG was acquired by Vifor Pharma in Nov-2021 for the development of treatments against calcification disorders at all stages of chronic kidney disease.

Awards and recognition

2022

 Maurice-Marie Janot Award - Association de Pharmacie Galénique Industrielle
 Samyang Award in honor of Sung Wan Kim- Controlled Release Society

2021
 Highly Cited Researcher in Pharmacology and Toxicology-Web of Science
 Dandelion Entrepreneurship Award - ETH Zurich
 Grand Prix de l`Académie nationale de Pharmacie
 Centennial Innovation Award in Research and Development – University of Montreal

2020
 Elected to membership in the European Academy of Sciences
 ERC Advanced Grant

2019
 Fellow of the American Association of Pharmaceutical Scientists

2018
 Highly Cited Researcher 2018 - Clarivate Analytics

2017
 Highly Cited Researcher 2017 - Clarivate Analytics

2016
 Highly Cited Researcher 2016 - Thomson Reuters
 American Association of Pharmaceutical Scientists Lipid Based Drug Delivery Outstanding Research award

2015
 Phoenix Prize, Pharmaceutical Technology
 Highly Cited Researcher 2015 - Thomson Reuters

2014
 Fellow of the Controlled Release Society
 APV Research Award for Outstanding Achievements in Pharmaceutical Sciences
 Highly Cited Researcher 2014 - Thomson Reuters

2010
Debiopharm Life Sciences Award

2008
 Steacie Fellowship

2004
 Controlled Release Society Young Investigator Award

2003
Astra Zeneca – AFPC Young Investigator Award

2002
Pfizer – Actualités Pharmaceutiques award (Research)

References

1969 births
Living people
Academic staff of ETH Zurich
University of Geneva alumni
Université de Montréal alumni
Academic staff of the Université de Montréal